Joseph Kyeong Kap-ryong (11 March 1930 – 16 December 2020) was a South Korean Roman Catholic bishop.

Kyeong Kap-ryong was born in South Korea and was ordained to the priesthood in 1962. He served as titular bishop of Buffada and auxiliary bishop of the Roman Catholic Archdiocese of Seoul from 1977 to 1984 and as bishop of the Roman Catholic Diocese of Daejeon, South Korea, from 1984 to 2005.

Notes

1930 births
2020 deaths
South Korean Roman Catholic bishops
Roman Catholic bishops of Daejeon
Roman Catholic bishops of Seoul